Last Light is the seventh album by Matt Pond PA, released in 2007.

Track listing
"Last Light" – 4:16
"People Have a Way" – 3:26
"Locate the Pieces" – 3:54
"Wild Girl" – 1:19
"Honestly" – 4:05
"Taught to Look Away" – 2:49
"Sunlight" – 3:54
"Basement Parties" – 3:03
"Until the East Coast Ends" – 1:35
"Foreign Bedrooms" – 3:49
"The Crush" – 4:25
"Giving it All Away" – 3:37
"It's Not So Bad At All" – 5:07

References

2007 albums
Matt Pond PA albums